Muddy Pond, also known as Lake Providence or Nun's Pond, is a  pond in Kingston, Massachusetts, located east of Route 80 and south of U.S. Route 44. The pond is not open to the public. The Sisters of Divine Providence runs Camp Mishannock, a summer camp for girls, at this pond. The water quality is impaired due to non-native aquatic plants.

References

External links
Environmental Protection Agency
South Shore Coastal Watersheds - Lake Assessments

Ponds of Plymouth County, Massachusetts
Ponds of Massachusetts
Congregation of Divine Providence
Summer camps in Massachusetts